Gaffney is a city in and the seat of Cherokee County, South Carolina, United States, in the Upstate region of South Carolina. Gaffney is known as the "Peach Capital of South Carolina". The population was 12,539 at the 2010 census, with an estimated population of 12,609 in 2019. It is the principal city of the Gaffney, South Carolina, Micropolitan Statistical Area (population 55,662 according to 2012 estimates by the U.S. Census Bureau), which includes all of Cherokee County and which is further included in the greater Greenville-Spartanburg-Anderson, South Carolina Combined Statistical Area (population 1,384,996 according to year 2012 U.S. Census Bureau estimates).

History

Michael A. Gaffney, born in Granard, Ireland, in 1775, emigrated to the United States in 1797, arriving in New York City and moving to Charleston, South Carolina, a few years later. Gaffney moved again in 1804 to the South Carolina Upcountry and established a tavern and lodging house at what became known as "Gaffney's Cross Roads". The location was perfect for growth because of the two major roads which met here, one from the mountains of North Carolina to Charleston and the other from Charlotte into Georgia. Michael Gaffney died here on September 6, 1854.

In 1872, the area became known as "Gaffney City". Gaffney became the county seat of Cherokee County which was formed out of parts of York, Union, and Spartanburg counties in 1897. Gaffney became a major center for the textile industry in South Carolina, which was the backbone of the county's economy up until the 1980s.

Despite the small amount of population growth, businesses and companies continue to locate within the city limits, especially along the bustling Floyd Baker Boulevard and Highway 105 and many other areas within the city limits.  However, most population growth recently has occurred outside of the city limits.

Uptown Gaffney began to languish after Interstate 85 was built in the county as industries located near the new highway. Recent renovations in downtown Gaffney have prompted more businesses to locate there, but there is still a great deal that is planned for the central part of the city. Many plans have been announced for the downtown area, including a  park that is currently being developed on the grounds of a recently demolished mill (Gaffney Manufacturing Co.). A plaza has been completed beside city hall and includes a refurbished fountain and extensive landscaping. Highlights to the upgrade of the city's park system include a skatepark, two passive parks, and several children's playgrounds.

In 2008, the Cherokee County History & Arts Museum opened on College Drive in the historic Central Elementary School building. The museum is operated by the Cherokee Historical & Preservation Society and is located on the mustering ground of the South Carolina militia (1812–1914). Located just blocks from downtown Gaffney and in one of the city's three nationally registered historic sites, the museum offers new cultural opportunities for locals and visitors, while having a positive economic impact for the downtown area. Annual events include a pottery show, car show, and ghost walk.

The city has recently hired an architectural firm to renovate the old Gaffney Post Office, located at the intersection of Frederick and Granard streets, into a visitor's center and art gallery.

There are also plans for a large cultural center to be placed in the downtown area. In 2009 Darren Mason was elected president of the Gaffney Downtown Business Association and has worked closely with city officials in revitalizing the Historic Downtown area which consists of about six blocks. New matching fund programs have been key to restoring old buildings by painting and using attractive awnings to spruce up the old look of main street.

Gaffney Station Farmers' Market has been established in a city parking lot directly across from the old post office downtown. The farmers' market operates on Wednesdays and Saturdays from June through October. There are plans to create a more permanent site for the farmer's market at that location. The city of Gaffney plans to build a partial replica of the old train depot that was once located there. The replica will house a portion of the farmer's market and also act as a landmark that calls back to the days of the old depot.

The city concluded Spring Session '08 of a popular concert series entitled "Shindig at the Gaffney Cabin". Bands perform on a weekly basis: Fridays during the Spring Session (May) and Thursdays during the Fall Session (late August through September). Concerts are held on Thursdays during Fall Sessions so as not to conflict with Gaffney Indian football games on Friday nights. The city will hold more of those concerts in 2009, this time from April to June 2009, and again from August to October of the same year.

Two serial killers have at different times attacked residents of Gaffney. In 1967–1968 Lee Roy Martin, known as the Gaffney Strangler, killed four women. In 2009, a series of shootings led to five deaths.

The Archeological Site 38CK1, Archeological Site 38CK44, Archeological Site 38CK45, Carnegie Free Library, Coopersville Ironworks Site (38CK2) and Susan Furnace Site (38CK67), Cowpens Furnace Site (38CK73), Winnie Davis Hall, Ellen Furnace Site (38CK68), Gaffney Commercial Historic District, Gaffney Residential Historic District, Irene Mill Finishing Plant, Jefferies House, Limestone Springs Historic District, Magness-Humphries House, Nesbitt's Limestone Quarry (38CK69), and Settlemyer House are listed in the National Register of Historic Places.

2009 spree killings

The city of Gaffney and surrounding Cherokee County came into the national spotlight during the summer of 2009 when a spree killer began killing residents of the rural town.

The first victim, a prominent peach farmer from western Cherokee County, was killed on June 27. On July 1, the killer was responsible for the death of an 83-year-old woman and her 50-year-old daughter. The two were found bound and shot to death in the elder woman's home near Gaffney. On July 2, 46-year-old Stephen Tyler was shot and killed in his appliance and furniture store; his teenage daughter, Abby, was critically wounded; she died of her injuries two days later.

The news spread quickly from the local newspaper to national and international media outlets including CNN, ABC News, The Wall Street Journal, and the BBC.

On July 6, police responding to an emergency call of a burglary in progress in Gaston County, North Carolina, shot and killed a suspect who drew a gun on them, injuring one officer. Ballistic tests and checks on the suspect's SUV indicated this to be the wanted killer, later identified as Patrick Tracy Burris.

Geography
Gaffney is located in northern South Carolina at  (35.071667, -81.650000), near the center of Cherokee County. It is served by the Charlotte and Greenville major airports. These airports are almost equidistant from Gaffney, with Greenville being slightly closer.

Interstate 85 passes along the northern edge of Gaffney, with access from Exits 90, 92, and 95. U.S. Route 29 passes through the center of Gaffney, leading northeast  to Blacksburg and southwest  to Cowpens. South Carolina Highway 18 leads north  to Shelby, North Carolina, becoming North Carolina Highway 18 along the way, and south  to Jonesville. South Carolina Highway 11 leads northwest  to Chesnee.

Demographics

2020 census

As of the 2020 United States census, there were 12,764 people, 4,220 households, and 2,116 families residing in the city.

2000 census
As of the census of 2000, there were 12,968 people, 5,304 households, and 3,336 families residing in the city. The population density was 1,649.7 people per square mile (637.0/km2). There were 5,765 housing units at an average density of 733.4 per square mile (283.2/km2). The racial makeup of the city was 50.48% White, 47.19% African American, 0.15% Native American, 0.45% Asian, 0.03% Pacific Islander, 0.99% from other races, and 0.71% from two or more races. Hispanic or Latino of any race were 1.98% of the population. 

There were 5,304 households, out of which 26.8% had children under the age of 18 living with them, 37.1% were married couples living together, 21.6% had a female householder with no husband present, and 37.1% were non-families. 33.3% of all households were made up of individuals, and 14.2% had someone living alone who was 65 years of age or older. The average household size was 2.32 and the average family size was 2.96.

In the city, the population was spread out, with 23.4% under the age of 18, 10.8% from 18 to 24, 25.7% from 25 to 44, 22.6% from 45 to 64, and 17.5% who were 65 years of age or older. The median age was 38 years. For every 100 females, there were 82.1 males. For every 100 females age 18 and over, there were 78.7 males.

The median income for a household in the city was $29,480, and the median income for a family was $38,449. Males had a median income of $30,145 versus $22,167 for females. The per capita income for the city was $17,755. About 13.3% of families and 26.2% of the population were below the poverty line, including 19.2% of those under age 18 and 18.0% of those age 65 or over.

Government
 Mayor: Dr. Randall Moss
 City Council members:
Harold D. Littlejohn, Sr. (District 1)
C. Allen Montgomery Jr.(District 2)
Rosa Webber (District 3)
Missy Reid Norris (District 4)
Kim F. Phillips (District 5)
Kasey Dill Carnley (District 6)

Education
Gaffney is served by the Cherokee County School District, which is one unified school district. Public schools in Gaffney include:

Gaffney High School
 Ewing Middle School
 Gaffney Middle School
 B D Lee Elementary School
 Limestone Central Elementary School
 Luther Vaughan Elementary School
 Mary Bramlett Elementary School

Private schools in Gaffney include:
Village School of Gaffney
Gaffney Christian Academy

Colleges & universities:
Limestone University
Spartanburg Community College - Cherokee County Campus, including a training building and Freightliner facility

The Gaffney High School football team is well-known regionally. The program boasts 18 state championships and alumni such as the Washington Redskins' Rocky McIntosh and University of South Carolina All-American and Minnesota Vikings' Sidney Rice. In the 2005–2006 school year the school was chosen as Palmetto's Finest, the highest honor for high schools in the state. The school has  succeeded greatly in increasing test scores across the board and increasing the graduation rate.

Gaffney has a public library, a branch of the Cherokee County Library System.

Healthcare 
Gaffney is home to several healthcare institutions:

Cherokee Medical Center 
Cherokee Medical Center, a division of Spartanburg Regional Healthcare System, is a 125-bed acute care facility located in Gaffney, S.C., that services Cherokee County and the surrounding areas. The hospital provides services including emergency, medical, surgical and imaging. Formerly Gaffney Medical Center, the hospital joined Mary Black Health System in 2015 and became Mary Black Health System — Gaffney. Mary Black facilities became part of Spartanburg Regional Healthcare System in 2019.

Gibbs Cancer Center & Research Institute at Gaffney 
Based in Spartanburg, Gibbs Cancer Center & Research Institute provides comprehensive cancer care to the Upstate South Carolina community and beyond. One of four locations, Gibbs at Gaffney opened in September 2011 with the mission of providing oncology services to the Cherokee County community.

Gibbs at Gaffney provides medical oncology and infusion services.

Immediate Care Center – Gaffney 
Located on Floyd Baker Boulevard, Immediate Care Center – Gaffney provides a hybrid of urgent and primary care.

Medical Group of the Carolinas 
A network of more than 100 practices in Upstate South Carolina, Medical Group of the Carolinas includes several medical practices in Cherokee County. The local offices include family and internal medicine, cardiology, orthopaedics, hematology oncology, urology and women's care.

Media 
 The Gaffney Ledger, the county's oldest local newspaper, published on Mondays, Wednesdays and Fridays
 The Cherokee Chronicle, local newspaper published on Tuesdays and Thursdays
 Spartanburg Herald-Journal, area newspaper
 WZZQ 104.3 FM and 1500 AM, local news, country music, local high school and college sports
 WFGN 1180 AM, gospel music
 WYFG 91.1 FM, Christian
 The Just Jesus Radio Network (online local religious programming)

Infrastructure
Transportation
Gaffney is located on the Interstate 85 corridor, linking it to Atlanta and Charlotte.

Public transit is available through the Gaffney Cab Company.

The Upstate region is served by two airports, Greenville–Spartanburg International Airport , also known as GSP International Airport ( to the southwest), and Charlotte Douglas International Airport (CLT,  to the northeast). Recent studies have proved that an airport is strongly needed in the county. Cherokee County is the only county in South Carolina without an airport. Requests are now being made to the federal government to support the construction of the new airport. Studies are also determining where the airport, if built, should be built.

The Gaffney Peachoid

Travelers know Gaffney from the Peachoid water tower making note that Gaffney is the peach capital of South Carolina, located along Interstate 85 near exit 92. The Peachoid is a water tower shaped like a peach. It serves both artistic and practical functions.

Notable people
 Charlie Blackwell-Thompson, NASA SLS/Orion Launch Director at Kennedy Space Center
 W. J. Cash, author
 Neil Chambers, author, designer
 Kertus Davis, NASCAR driver
 Elizabeth Eslami, author
 Robert E. Hall, eleventh Sergeant Major of the Army, Oct 21, 1997 - June 23, 2000
 Andie MacDowell, actress
 Michael McCluney, member of the band Day26
 Rocky McIntosh, professional football player with the Washington Redskins
 Sara McMann, mixed martial artist
 Mikki Moore, professional basketball player for the Golden State Warriors
 Arizona Reid, Israeli National League basketball player
 Sidney Rice, professional football player
 Dominique Stevenson, former football player for the Tennessee Volunteers and the Buffalo Bills
 Gaylord Perry, Hall of Fame pitcher and two time winner of the Cy Young Award

In popular culture
Fictional politician Frank Underwood, the protagonist of the Netflix series House of Cards'', is a native of the city and its congressman in the U.S. House of Representatives (for South Carolina's 5th congressional district) and later President of the United States. The Peachoid was shown, and referred to in multiple episodes.

See also
List of cities and towns in South Carolina

References

External links
 City of Gaffney official website
 Gaffney Downtown Business Association

 
Cities in South Carolina
Cities in Cherokee County, South Carolina
County seats in South Carolina
Populated places established in 1872
1872 establishments in South Carolina